Delvin is both a given name and surname. Notable people with the name include:

Delvin Breaux (born 1989), American football player
Delvin Brown (born 1979), American football defensive back
Delvin Countess (born 1982), American soccer player
Delvin Pinheiro Frederico (born 1995), Dutch professional footballer
Delvin Goh (born 1995), Singaporean basketball player
Delvin Lamar Hughley (born 1978), American football player
Delvin James (born 1978), American football player
Delvin Joyce (born 1978), American football player
Delvin Miller (1913–1996), harness racing driver, trainer, and owner
Delvin Myles (born 1972), American football player
Delvin N'Dinga (born 1988), Congolese footballer
Delvin Pérez (born 1998), Puerto Rican baseball infielder
Delvin Rodríguez (born 1980), Dominican boxer
Delvin Rumbino (born 1995), Indonesian footballer
Delvin Williams (born 1951), American football player
Jean Delvin (1853–1922), Belgian painter
Jerome Delvin (born 1956), American politician